The 17th General Assembly of Nova Scotia represented Nova Scotia between 1843 and 1847.

The assembly sat at the pleasure of the Governor of Nova Scotia, Lucius Bentinck Cary. Jeremiah Dickson became governor in 1846.

William Young was chosen as speaker for the house.

List of members

Notes:

References
Journal and proceedings of the House of Assembly, 1844 (1844)

Terms of the General Assembly of Nova Scotia
1843 in Canada
1844 in Canada
1845 in Canada
1846 in Canada
1847 in Canada
1843 establishments in Nova Scotia
1847 disestablishments in Nova Scotia